Michael Ryan Lobel (born March 7, 1984) is a Canadian actor. He is best known for playing the role of Jay Hogart in the teen drama Degrassi: The Next Generation from 2003 to 2010.

Life and career
Lobel is the oldest of three siblings from the same parents. Mike Lobel has an older half-brother; they share the same father. At a young age he began showing interest in music and visual arts which drew him to Etobicoke School of the Arts. He attended ESA from 1998 to 2003, first majoring in music (he studied percussion) then later switching to drama. While at the school he formed several musical groups and is currently working on his solo project. It was in his graduating year at ESA that he began working as an actor.

In 2003, Lobel made his film debut in an adaptation of Oliver Twist directed by Jacob Tierney entitled Twist, in which he played a small role as a street thug alongside actor Nick Stahl.

Lobel's most notable performance to date is his portrayal of Jay Hogart, a manipulative school bully on Degrassi: The Next Generation. He maintains that he is nothing like his character in real life. Lobel originally auditioned for the role of Dylan Michalchuk, a complete opposite role of his current, but was instead offered the role of Jay.

Lobel has appeared on television in Zixx: Level One and Sue Thomas F.B.Eye and has had starring roles in Selling Innocence and Booky Makes Her Mark. He made a guest appearance on a television series in 2007, The Best Years.

In 2008, Lobel joined the indie rock band Future Peers, formerly known as Boys Who Say No, and played the synth. The band broke up in 2019.

From 2011 to 2013, he played the role of DJ on the sitcom Really Me. In 2015, he played the small role of Marc the Canadian TV movie The Music in Me.

Filmography

External links

 Mike Lobel TV.com
 Mike Lobel The-N.com

References

1984 births
21st-century Canadian male actors
Canadian male film actors
Canadian male television actors
Living people
Male actors from Toronto